Garden Wall may refer to:

Garden Wall, an arête in Glacier National Park, Montana, United States
Garden Wall (band), British band, one of two bands that joined to become Genesis

See also
Garden wall bond, in brickwork
Gardenwall, a house in Minneapolis, Minnesota, United States